The following are the winners of the 44th annual (2017) Origins Award, presented at Origins 2018:

Fan Favorites

Academy of Adventure Gaming Arts & Design Hall of Fame
Eric M. Lang and Ken St. Andre

References

External links
 Origins Awards Winners  2018 – 44th Annual Ceremony

2017 awards
2017 awards in the United States